Mak So Ning "Tania" (born November 5, 1986 in Hong Kong) is a Chinese triathlete who competed for Hong Kong at the 2008 Summer Olympics.

In 2008, she did not finish in the Olympic triathlon event after being lapped on the cycling course.

External links
 profile 

1986 births
Living people
Hong Kong female triathletes
Olympic triathletes of Hong Kong
Triathletes at the 2008 Summer Olympics
Triathletes at the 2006 Asian Games
Asian Games competitors for Hong Kong